OA, O.A., Oa, or oa may refer to:

Arts and entertainment 
 Oa, a fictional planet in the DC Comics universe
 The OA, a television series
 OpenArena, a video game
 Opie and Anthony (often "O&A"), a radio show
 Oriental Adventures, a Dungeons & Dragons sourcebook
 Orion's Arm, a science fiction project

Businesses and organisations 
 Obavještajna agencija, the Croatian Intelligence Agency
 Office administration
 Oficina Anticorrupción, an Argentine law enforcement agency
 Olympic Air (IATA code OA)
 Opera Australia, an opera company
 Opportunitas aequa, a Canadian organization
 Overeaters Anonymous
 Oxford Academy (California), a high school
 Orbital ATK, an aerospace company

People 
 Ma'am OA, nickname of Andrea Veneracion, founder of the Philippine Madrigal Singers
 Oskar Andersson, Swedish cartoonist who uses the pen name O.A.

Places 
 Oa (Attica), a deme of ancient Attica
 Ocean Acres, New Jersey, United States
 Orakzai Agency, Pakistan
 The Oa, Scotland, United Kingdom

Honors 
 Order of Australia, a formal honour
 Order of the Arrow, the honor society of the Boy Scouts of America

Science and technology 
 Office automation
 Oleic acid, a fatty acid
 Open access, the free online availability of digital content from scholarly sources
 Operational amplifier, an electronic component
 Operational analysis, more generally called "operational research", a branch of applied mathematics
 Osteoarthritis, a disease
 Length overall (also o/a, o.a. or oa), an abbreviation for overall, used when describing the length of a ship
 Oxford Archaeology

Other uses 
 Oa (digraph)
 Obituaries Australia, an online database of obituaries
 Office Action, a communication from the U.S. Patent and Trademark Office
 Old Alleynian, an old boy of Dulwich College
 Old Albanian, an old boy of St Alban School, St Albans 
 Order of Appearance, a synonym for Order of battle
 Output area, an area of approximately 100 households, derived from the UK Census

See also 
 0A (disambiguation)
 OOA (disambiguation)